Maļinova Parish is an administrative unit of Augšdaugava Municipality in the Latgale region of Latvia.

Villages of Maļinova Parish 
 Maļinova (parish centre)

References

 
Parishes of Latvia
Latgale